Francis Eugene "Frank" Stewart (20 February 192316 April 1979), Australian  politician and rugby league footballer, was a member of the Australian House of Representatives representing Lang between 1953 and 1977 and subsequently Grayndler between 1977 and 1979 for the Australian Labor Party.

Early life and army career
Stewart was born in the Sydney suburb of Belmore and educated at St Joseph's School, Belmore and St Mary's Cathedral College, Sydney. Before World War II, he was a public servant in the New South Wales Department of Transport.
In the war, he served in the Second Australian Imperial Force in New Guinea with the 39th Transport Platoon in 1944 and 1945 and was eventually promoted to sergeant.  Prior to his election to parliament, he played first grade rugby league for Canterbury Bankstown Bulldogs between 1948 and 1950. He married Maureen Neagle Smith in August 1952.

Political career
Having been a member of the ALP since 1942, Stewart was elected as the federal member for Lang in 1953. Belonging to the right-wing Catholic faction of the party, he was widely considered a grouper, although unlike many other "groupers" he never left the Labor Party.

When Gough Whitlam became prime minister in 1972, Stewart was appointed Minister for Tourism and Recreation.  He strongly opposed both the legalising of abortion and the  no-fault divorce reform which became law in 1975.

As Vice-President of the Executive Council, in 1975, Stewart presided over the meeting that revoked Rex Connor's authority to raise overseas funds. The Sydney Morning Herald later published allegations that he was so concerned about Connor dealings with Tirath Khemlani as to have leaked information to the opposition on the Loans Affair.

After the fall of the Whitlam government, Stewart moved to the backbench.  When Lang was abolished prior to the 1977 election, he transferred to Grayndler. He died in Long Jetty, New South Wales, of a heart attack while playing squash and was survived by his wife, five daughters and one son. Kevin Stewart (1928–2006), Health Minister in the New South Wales government led by Neville Wran, was Frank's younger brother.

Australian Institute of Sport
As Minister for Tourism and Recreation, in 1974 Stewart appointed a study group to report on the feasibility of establishing an Australian sports institute. Released in 1975, the report recommended the establishment of a sports institute, now known as the Australian Institute of Sport (AIS). One of the buildings at the AIS is named after Frank Stewart in recognition of the central role he played in the institute's establishment.

Rugby league
Patrick Francis Stewart, the father of both Kevin and Frank Stewart, was the founding president of the Canterbury Bankstown Leagues Club. The Stewart family have been long-term supporters of the Canterbury Bankstown Bulldogs and Frank played first-grade rugby league for the Bulldogs from 1948 to 1950. In recognition of this support, the grandstand at Belmore Sports Ground (the former home ground of the club) is named the "Stewart Stand" after Patrick, Frank, and Kevin Stewart.

Following an incident where Canterbury Bankstown Bulldogs football club was stripped of all points in the National Rugby League competition for breach of the salary cap, Kevin Stewart was appointed chairman of the board in 2002 in an attempt to restore the club's reputation.

Notes

Australian rugby league players
Canterbury-Bankstown Bulldogs players
1923 births
1979 deaths
Members of the Australian House of Representatives for Grayndler
Members of the Australian House of Representatives for Lang
Members of the Australian House of Representatives
Australian Labor Party members of the Parliament of Australia
Australian public servants
Australian sportsperson-politicians
1975 Australian constitutional crisis
20th-century Australian politicians
Rugby league players from Sydney
Australian Army personnel of World War II
Australian Army soldiers